Gonzalo Rodríguez Anaya (born 21 October 1942) is a Mexican politician affiliated with the National Action Party (formerly to the Institutional Revolutionary Party). He served as a federal deputy of the LIX Legislature of the Mexican Congress representing Hidalgo, and previously served as a local deputy in the LII and LV Legislatures of the Congress of Hidalgo.

References

1942 births
Living people
Politicians from Hidalgo (state)
Institutional Revolutionary Party politicians
National Action Party (Mexico) politicians
20th-century Mexican politicians
21st-century Mexican politicians
Members of the Congress of Hidalgo
National Autonomous University of Mexico alumni
Members of the Chamber of Deputies (Mexico) for Hidalgo (state)